East Asian Yogācāra ("'Consciousness Only' school" or , "'Dharma Characteristics' school") refers to the traditions in East Asia which developed out of the Indian Buddhist Yogachara systems. 

The 4th-century Gandharan brothers, Asaṅga and Vasubandhu, are considered the classic philosophers and systematizers of this school, along with its other founder, Maitreya-natha. Asian Buddhist scholars such as Xuanzang and his students Kuiji, Woncheuk and Dōshō were also pivotal to the founding and development of the tradition in East Asia.

Etymology
The term Fǎxiàng itself was first applied to this tradition by the Huayan teacher Fazang, who used it to characterize Consciousness Only teachings as provisional, dealing with the phenomenal appearances of the dharmas. Chinese proponents preferred the title Wéishí, meaning "Consciousness Only" (Sanskrit Vijñaptimātra).

This school may also be called Wéishí Yújiāxíng Pài ( "Consciousness-Only Yogācāra School") or Yǒu Zōng ( "School of Existence"). Yin Shun also introduced a threefold classification for Buddhist teachings which designates this school as Xūwàng Wéishí Xì ( "False Imagination Mere Consciousness System").

Characteristics

Like the parent Yogācāra school, the Faxiang school teaches that understanding of reality comes from one's own mind, rather than actual empirical experience.  The mind distorts reality and projects it as reality itself. In keeping with Yogācāra tradition, the mind is divided into the Eight Consciousnesses and the Four Aspects of Cognition, which produce what we view as reality.

Faxiang Buddhism also maintained the Five Natures Doctrine which brought it into doctrinal conflict with the Tiantai school in China.

History in China

Early history and teachers
Translations of Indian Yogācāra texts were first introduced to China in the early fifth century. Among these was Guṇabhadra's translation of the Laṅkāvatāra Sūtra in four fascicles, which would also become important in the early history of Chan Buddhism.

During the sixth century CE, the Indian monk and translator Paramārtha widely propagated Yogācāra teachings in China. His translations include the Saṃdhinirmocana Sūtra, the Madhyāntavibhāga-kārikā, the Triṃśikā-vijñaptimātratā, and the Mahāyānasaṃgraha. Paramārtha also taught widely on the principles of Consciousness Only, and developed a large following in southern China. Many monks and laypeople traveled long distances to hear his teachings, especially those on the Mahāyānasaṃgraha.

Xuanzang and Kuiji

Although Yogācāra teachings had been propagated widely, most look to Xuanzang as the most important founder of East Asian Yogācāra. At the age of 33, Xuanzang made a dangerous journey to India in order to study Buddhism there and to procure Buddhist texts for translation into Chinese. This journey was later the subject of legend and eventually fictionalized as the classic Chinese novel Journey to the West, a major component of East Asian popular culture from Chinese opera to Japanese television (Monkey Magic). Xuanzang spent over ten years in India traveling and studying under various Buddhist masters. These masters included Śīlabhadra, the abbot of the Nālandā Mahāvihāra, who was then 106 years old. Xuanzang was tutored in the Yogācāra teachings by Śīlabhadra for several years at Nālandā. Upon his return from India, Xuanzang brought with him a wagon-load of Buddhist texts, including important Yogācāra works such as the Yogācārabhūmi-śastra. In total, Xuanzang had procured 657 Buddhist texts from India. Upon his return to China, he was given government support and many assistants for the purpose of translating these texts into Chinese.

As an important contribution to East Asian Yogācāra, Xuanzang composed the treatise Cheng Weishi Lun, or "Discourse on the Establishment of Consciousness Only." This work is framed around Vasubandhu's Triṃśikā-vijñaptimātratā, or "Thirty Verses on Consciousness Only." Xuanzang upheld Dharmapala of Nalanda's commentary on this work as being the correct one, and provided his own explanations of these as well as other views in the Cheng Weishi Lun. This work was composed at the behest of Xuanzang's disciple Kuiji, and became a central representation of East Asian Yogācāra. Xuanzang also promoted devotional meditative practices toward Maitreya Bodhisattva. Xuanzang's disciple Kuiji wrote a number of important commentaries on the Yogācāra texts and further developed the influence of this doctrine in China, and was recognized by later adherents as the first true patriarch of the school.

Later history and the modern era
In time, Chinese Yogācāra was weakened due to competition with other Chinese Buddhist traditions such as Tiantai, Huayan, Chan and Pure Land Buddhism.  Nevertheless, it continued to exert an influence, and Chinese Buddhists relied on its translations, commentaries, and concepts heavily, absorbing Yogācāra teachings into the other traditions.

Yogācāra teachings and concepts remained popular in Chinese Buddhism, including visions of the bodhisattva Maitreya and teachings given from him in Tuṣita, usually observed by advanced meditators. One such example is that of Hanshan Deqing during the Ming dynasty. In his autobiography, Hanshan describes the palace of Maitreya in Tuṣita, and hearing a lecture given by Maitreya to a large group of his disciples.

Hanshan recalls the teaching given as the following:

In the early part of the 20th century, the laymen Yang Wenhui and Ouyang Jian (歐陽漸) (1871–1943) promoted Buddhist learning in China, and the general trend was for an increase in studies of Buddhist traditions such as Yogācāra, Sanlun, and Huayan. In his 1929 book on the history of Chinese Buddhism, Jiang Weiqiao wrote:

Ouyang Jian founded the Chinese Institute of Inner Studies, which provided education in Yogācāra teachings and the Mahāyāna prajñā class of sūtras, given to both monastics and laypeople. Many modern Chinese Buddhist scholars are second-generation descendants of this school or have been influenced by it indirectly.

History in Japan

The Consciousness-Only teachings were transmitted to Japan as Hossō, and they made considerable impact. One of the founders of the Hossō sect in Japan was Kuiji.  Although a relatively small Hossō sect exists in Japan to this day, its influence has diminished as the center of Buddhist authority moved away from Nara, and with the rise of the Ekayāna schools of Buddhism.  During its height, scholars of the Hossō school frequently debated with other emerging schools.  Both the founder of Shingon Buddhism, Kūkai, and the founder of Tendai, Saichō, exchanged letters of debate with Hossō scholar Tokuitsu, which became particularly heated in the case of Saichō. Nevertheless, the Hossō maintained amicable relations with the Shingon esoteric sect, and adopted its practices while providing further scholarship on Yogacara philosophy.

Hōnen, founder of the Jōdo-shū Pure Land sect, likewise sought advice from Hossō scholars of his time as a novice monk, and later debated with them after establishing his sect. Another Hossō scholar, Jōkei was among Hōnen's toughest critics, and frequently sought to refute his teachings, while simultaneously striving, as Hōnen did, to make Buddhism accessible to a wider audience by reviving devotion to the bodhisattva Maitreya and teaching followers the benefits of rebirth in the Tuṣita rather than the pure land of Amitābha. Jōkei is also a leading figure in the efforts to revive monastic discipline at places like Tōshōdai-ji, Kōfuku-ji and counted other notable monks among his disciples, including Eison, who founded the Shingon Risshu sect.

During the Meiji period, as tourism became more common, the Hossō sect was the owner of several famous temples, notably Hōryū-ji and Kiyomizu-dera. However, as the Hossō sect had ceased Buddhist study centuries prior, the head priests were not content with giving part of their tourism income to the sect's organization. Following the end of World War II, the owners of these popular temples broke away from the Hossō sect, in 1950 and 1965, respectively. The sect still maintains Kōfuku-ji and Yakushi-ji.

History in Korea
East Asian Yogācāra were transmitted to Korea. The most well-known Korean figure of Beopsang was Woncheuk, who studied under the Chinese monk Xuanzang. Woncheuk is well known amongst scholars of Tibetan Buddhism for his commentary on the Saṃdhinirmocana Sūtra. While in China, Woncheuk took as a disciple a Korean-born monk named Dojeung, who travelled to Silla in 692 and propounded and propagated Woncheuk's exegetical tradition there where it flourished.

In Korea, Beopsang teachings did not endure long as a distinct school, but its teachings were frequently included in later schools of thought.

Notes

Bibliography
 
 
 
 
 
 
 
 
 
 
 
 
 
 

History of Buddhism in China
Buddhism in the Nara period
History of Buddhism in Korea
East Asian religions
Yogacara